Janesville-Waldorf-Pemberton High School is a public school in Janesville, Minnesota, United States. JWP stands for Janesville, Waldorf, and Pemberton, the towns the school district covers. The school building holds all grades K-12. School colors are blue and silver, JWP's mascot is the Bulldogs. They are one of 12 teams in the Gopher Conference. The 9-12 enrollment is a little over 200. 

The Grammy-winning opera tenor Aaron Sheehan is an alumnus of the school.

References

External links

Public high schools in Minnesota
Schools in Waseca County, Minnesota